Kathleen Key (born Kitty Lanahan; April 1, 1903 – December 22, 1954) was an American actress who achieved a brief period of fame during the silent era. She is best remembered for playing Tirzah in the 1925 film Ben-Hur.

Early life and career

Born in Buffalo, New York, Key made her debut in the 1920 Australian film The Jackeroo of Coolabong, playing a lead role. From that point on to the end of the 1920s, Kathleen Key, sometimes credited as Kathleen Keys, starred in several films, but never really reached stardom itself, and never gained much notice for the roles she had, although there were some exceptions.

In 1922, she was featured in Omar Khayyam (which was not released until 1925 as A Lover's Oath) and played a vamp in Where's My Wandering Boy Tonight?. The same year she signed to play with Charles Buck Jones in Vamoos for Fox Film.

Key spent a year in Australia as a leading lady in Snow Baker productions around this time. Prior to making Vamoos, Kathleen starred with John Gilbert in St. Elmo, also for Fox studios. She was cast as an "innocent young thing" rather than playing her usual vamp role. 

An early career highpoint was her selection as one of the 1923 WAMPAS Baby Stars; however, by the end of the decade Key’s had her last significant film role, as Colette in 1929’s The Phantom of the North,. Her name does not appear in the credits of her four final films: as Rosalie Lawrence in Sweeping Against the Winds (1930), as an unnamed Guest in Thunder in the Night (1935), and in 1936, as a Dance Hall Girl in Klondike Annie, and finally, a bit part in One Rainy Afternoon. After these last, tiny roles, Key apparently retired from film altogether.

Personal life
In the early 1930s, Key had a well-known love affair with silent-film actor Buster Keaton, who was married at the time. As told in Marion Meade's biography of Keaton, the actor attempted to call off the relationship, but Key flew into a jealous rage and ransacked his MGM dressing room, which caused her to be virtually blacklisted afterward by the movie industry. Sidney Skolsky, a Daily News columnist, sent Keaton a joking telegram, reading: "Congratulations. Hear you are off Key." It was also reported that the dressing-room fracas was sparked by Keaton refusing to give Key a monetary loan.

Death
After her retirement in 1936, Keys spent the rest of her days in moderate comfort at the Motion Picture Country House in Woodland Hills, California, where she died at the age of 51, from undisclosed causes, in 1954. She was interred at Valhalla Memorial Park Cemetery.

Filmography

References

Further reading
The Los Angeles Times, "In Race to Reign at Legion's Fete", November 9, 1921, Page III 1.
The Los Angeles Times, "Dancers Versatile", January 16, 1922, Page 19.
The Los Angeles Times, "Stops Vamping Awhile", July 28, 1922, Page I 14.

External links

 
 

1903 births
1954 deaths
American film actresses
American silent film actresses
Burials at Valhalla Memorial Park Cemetery
Actresses from Buffalo, New York
20th-century American actresses
WAMPAS Baby Stars